Gennadi Borisovich Bondarenko (born 4 February 1929 in Gagra; died 10 April 1989 in Leningrad) was a Soviet Russian football player and coach.

Honours
 Soviet Top League champion: 1954.

External links
 

1929 births
People from Gagra District
1989 deaths
Georgian people of Ukrainian descent
Georgian emigrants to Russia
Soviet footballers
Soviet Top League players
FC Dinamo Sukhumi players
FC Dynamo Saint Petersburg players
FC Dynamo Moscow players
FC Zenit Saint Petersburg players
Soviet football managers
FC Zenit Saint Petersburg managers
FC Dynamo Saint Petersburg managers
Neftçi PFK managers
FK Daugava Rīga managers
FC Neftyanik Ufa managers
Association football forwards